Saraca dives, is a tree species in genus Saraca belonging to the family Fabaceae, native to China, Laos, and Vietnam.

References

dives
Trees of Laos
Trees of Vietnam
Trees of China